Jodi Chrissie Garcia Sta. Maria (born June 16, 1982) is a Filipino actress and singer.  Dubbed as the country’s ‘Silent Superstar’, she is notable for her versatility in comedy, horror, and drama across independent film, blockbusters and television. She has been nominated for a FAMAS Award and 2 Gawad Urian Awards. In 2014, she won the "Favorite Foreign Actress” trophy at the Vietnam Green Star Awards. In 2016, she was nominated for "Best Performance by an Actress" at the 44th International Emmy Awards for her role as Amor Powers in Pangako sa ’Yo. In 2022, Sta. Maria won Best Drama Actress at the Golden Laurel Batangas Province Media Awards and Best Actress in a Leading Role at the Asian Academy Creative Awards.

Personal life
Sta. Maria is the youngest child. She and her brother were raised by their single mother, Mercedita. She attended the Philippine Pasay Chung Hua Academy and was an honor student. In school, Sta. Maria was active in her school's extra-curricular activities, particularly the volleyball varsity team and the debating team.

Sta. Maria was married to Panfilo "Pampi" Lacson Jr., the son of Senator Panfilo Lacson, from whom she is now separated. The two met during a taping of Tabing Ilog and married on Easter Sunday 2005 in Las Vegas. The two separated in March 2011 and thereafter Sta. Maria filed a petition for the declaration of nullity of marriage with the Regional Trial Court on grounds of psychological incapacity. The court declared their marriage "null and void" in 2014 but that decision was junked by the Court of Appeals in 2016 and affirmed in 2017.

Sta. Maria and Lacson have a son born in 2005 named Panfilo "Thirdy" Lacson III. In a 2016 interview, Sta. Maria revealed that she was greatly affected by her separation from Lacson, which resulted in alcoholism and drug use. She quit smoking, alcohol, and drugs after the intervention of actress Coney Reyes and became a Born again Christian. The success of her TV series Be Careful With My Heart in 2012 also helped her recover from her addictions.

Sta. Maria attended De La Salle University-Dasmariñas and studied Medical Biology as her prerequisite to studying Medicine. She left college after a year due to the sudden success of her series Be Careful With My Heart, which was extended from its intended run of 3 months to 2 and 1/2 years. Sta. Maria finished her degree in Psychology at Southville International School and Colleges in 2020. She was a Dean's Lister during her last semester in 2019.

She has been a WHO Ambassador since 2011.

Career
A talent scout approached Sta. Maria and her friends to audition for commercials while at a fast-food chain. After numerous auditions and no offers, they gave up. A few weeks later, the talent scout approached Sta. María once again and encouraged her to audition for Star Magic. At 15, she was one of the youngest in their batch.

After starring and appearing in teen-oriented shows and movies such as Gimik, Flames, and Jologs, Sta. Maria landed a role in Tabing Ilog as the sassy tomboyish Georgina. The show was successful and ran for almost five years. She also became a host of Star Circle Quest alongside Luis Manzano.

She was cast in the original version of Pangako Sa 'Yo (2000) as Lia Buenavista, and starred in the 2015 remake as Amor Powers.

After playing teen roles, she played villainous characters in primetime shows such as Walang Kapalit and Kampanerang Kuba. She transitioned to star in numerous independent films, which have been screened internationally. She has since received 2 Gawad Urian Award nominations.

In 2010, she starred in Noah alongside Piolo Pascual, who has called her a 'thinking actress'. In 2011, she played Sophia in the critically acclaimed 100 Days to Heaven. In 2012, Jodi had a special participation as in the daytime drama series Mundo Man ay Magunaw until she rose up when she top-billed the sleeper hit Be Careful With My Heart as Maya dela Rosa along with Richard Yap who played her love interest, Richard Lim. The show became a success worldwide, spawning albums, worldwide tours, and concerts.

Her portrayal as Amor Powers in the 2015 remake of Pangako Sa ‘Yo earned her an International Emmy Award for Best Actress nomination, the second Filipina actress to earn such a distinction. Since then, she has starred in drama series, such as daytime drama Sana Dalawa ang Puso, and primetime series, Sino ang May Sala? and  Ang sa Iyo ay Akin. 

In 2022, she stars in the Philippine adaptation of Doctor Foster, The Broken Marriage Vow. On September 8, 2020, ABS-CBN announced that Sta. Maria will be one of the official cast for the upcoming Metro Manila Film Festival entry Labyu with an Accent , and she will be paired by Coco Martin.

Filmography

Television

Films

Awards and nominations

References

External links

1982 births
Filipino child actresses
Filipino film actresses
Filipino television actresses
Filipino women comedians
People from Santa Rosa, Laguna
People from Laguna (province)
Living people
Star Circle Quest
Star Magic
ABS-CBN personalities
20th-century Filipino actresses
21st-century Filipino actresses
Filipino Christians